British Borneo comprised the four northern parts of the island of Borneo, which are now the country of Brunei, two Malaysian states of Sabah and Sarawak, and the Malaysian federal territory of Labuan. During the British colonial rule before World War II, Sarawak was known as the Raj of Sarawak (1841–1946), Sabah was known as North Borneo (1881–1946), and Labuan was known as the Crown Colony of Labuan (1848–1946). Between World War II and their independence from Britain, Sarawak became the Crown Colony of Sarawak (1946–1963) whereas Sabah and Labuan combined to form the Crown Colony of North Borneo (1946–1963).  The Kingdom of Brunei (1888/1906-1984) was a protectorate of the United Kingdom since the 1888/1906 Protectorate Agreement, and was known as British Protectorate State of Brunei.

Catholic missions 
In 1687 Father Ventimiglia, a Theatine, was commissioned by Pope Innocent XI to preach Christianity in Borneo. There are no memorials of this mission, which has left no traces in the island although the missionary declared that God had blessed his labours.

The Congregation for the Evangelization of Peoples decreed on 27 August 1855 the erection of the northern part of the island of Borneo into an independent prefecture of North Borneo and Labuan and entrusted it to the Rev. Carlos Cuarteroni, a Spaniard. Father Cuarteron was originally a sea-captain and had vowed, after escaping great peril, to devote himself to the evangelisation of Borneo. He landed at Labuan in 1857, in company with several missionaries who deserted him in 1860. Although alone in the island of Labuan, Father Cuarteroni courageously continued his labours. At length, seeing that isolation made him powerless, he went to Rome in 1879 to request that the Propaganda place the mission in charge of an institute. From Rome Father Cuarteroni went to Spain, where he soon died.

The prefect Apostolic lives at Labuan. The stations served are Labuan and Kuching (Sarawak), the two most important towns. Outside of these two places where the missionaries live ten stations are visited: Sibu, Kanowit, Igan, Oya, Mukah, Baram, Papar, Jesselton, Putatan, and Sandakan. According to the " Missions-Atlas " of P. Streit, the statistics of the Catholic mission in the early 20th century were: 19 regular priests, 2 lay brothers, 15 sisters; 8 churches; 20 chapels; 16 catechists; 14 schools with 740 pupils; 2,600 baptisms; about 1,000 catechumens.

British power 
The British had obtained the island of Labuan in 1846; they gradually extended their power over the petty rulers of the northern part of Borneo until, in 1888, the British protectorate of North Borneo was formally acknowledged. English speaking missionaries being desired in the British part of Borneo, the Propaganda (19 March 1881) confided the mission of North Borneo and Labuan to the Society for Foreign Missions of Mill Hill, from England. The first prefect Apostolic appointed under the new administration was the Rev. Thomas Jackson. The society continued in charge of the mission.

During the Second World War, the British realised they were unable to defend the colony from the powerful Imperial Japanese Navy. They destroyed the airfields, and especially the oil fields there and in Brunei before the Japanese landed on 16 December 1941. The small British forces surrendered. In 1943, the Chinese population of about 50,000 rebelled against Japan and seized some towns. They were overwhelmed with many executed. Australia sent special operation forces, which trained and armed local militia units and aided the landing of an Australian division in June 1945. Japanese forces numbered about 31,000, and held out until October 1945, long after the Emperor had surrendered.

Diagram

References

Further reading 
 
 WorldStatesmen- Malaysia historical context (see Labuan and Sabah sections); not worked in here

 
History of Borneo
British rule in Malaysian history
Former colonies in Asia
Former countries in Southeast Asia
Borneo, British
History of Brunei
History of Sabah
History of Sarawak
History of Malaysia (1945–1963)
British Malaya
Labuan
1848 establishments in Asia
1963 disestablishments in Asia
Borneo
Borneo
19th-century establishments in Malaysia
1960s disestablishments in Malaysia
1840s establishments in Southeast Asia
1960s disestablishments in Southeast Asia
Brunei–United Kingdom relations
Malaysia–United Kingdom relations